Spin Move Records is a boutique independent record label based in Santa Monica, California and has released recordings from a variety of artists, including Ainjel Emme, Amy Kuney, Frank Bell, Jessica Sanchez, Rochelle Diamante, and Winsome Kin.

Peter A. Barker founded Spin Move Records in 1996 and then resurrected the label with partner Marc Schrobilgen in 2004.  This label is owned by Threshold Media Corp.

History
The first release on Spin Move Records was Winsome Kin's eponymous CD in 1996. The label went on hiatus and was resurrected in 2004 with the release of Amy Kuney's "EP". In 2008 the label released Amy Kuney's critically acclaimed full length entitled "Bird's Eye View". Also in 2008 the label started working with a then 14 year old Jessica Sanchez. A cover version of "Please Don't Stop the Music" was released. Sanchez went on to place 2nd in the 11th season of American Idol in 2012.

Other releases during this period where James Jr's "Intent 2 Distribute" in 2009, Ainjel Emme's "Everyone is Beautiful" in 2011 and Barnaby Saints "EP" in 2012. In 2010 Spin Move started working with Youtube artist Rochelle Diamante. The label released a number of singles culminating in the release of "Queen Bee" in 2013. Queen Bee has become an international dance sensation having been featured on Dancing with the Stars three times.

In 2015 Spin Move started working with a young songwriter/producer named Hero DeLano. DeLano started at the labels recording studio as an intern. Hero's debut is planned for 2018. In 2017 the label released a number of singles by artists Brianna Leah, Jason Parris featuring Beekwilder, Beekwilder, Moses Stone, and ORLY. All of the songs were co-written and produced by DeLano.

In 2016 a young Dutch singer by the name of Sam Beekwilder showed up at the studio for a party. Hero heard him sing and loved his voice. This is the artist known as Beekwilder. Spin Move released his debut "Oh MY" in 2017. His first mix tape entitled "Bungalow Bill" will be released in 2018. Beekwilder is currently working on his debut full length.

Roster
Beekwilder
Hero DeLano
Diipsilence
O RLY
Jacob Stewart
Säm Wilder
Margie Mays

Former
Ainjel Emme
Amy Kuney
Barnaby Saints
Frank Bell 
James Jr.
Jessica Sanchez
Karlis
Olivia Thai
Rochelle Diamante
Winsome Kin

References

External links
Official site

Alternative rock record labels
American independent record labels
Indie rock record labels
Record labels based in California
Record labels established in 1996